Emmanuel Petit (born 4 December 1972) is a French sport shooter.

He participated at the 2018 ISSF World Shooting Championships, winning a medal.

References

External links

Living people
1972 births
French male sport shooters
Skeet shooters
Sportspeople from La Rochelle
Shooters at the 2020 Summer Olympics
20th-century French people
21st-century French people